Banco Azteca is a Mexican bank chain which operates in Mexico, Panama, Guatemala, Honduras, Peru and El Salvador. The company's products are consumer credit for goods, personal loans, small business loans, credit cards, mortgages and payroll systems.

In March 2002, Banco Azteca was formed when Grupo Elektra received the required financial services licence. The bank began operating on October 30, 2002.

The bank was criticized in a 2007 BusinessWeek magazine article for abusing microcredit practices in Mexico due to lax bankruptcy, consumer protection and interest rates laws of the country.

There was a Brazilian branch named Banco Azteca do Brasil S/A, opened in 2008 and put under extrajudicial liquidation in 2016.

References

Banks established in 2002
Banks of Mexico
Companies based in Mexico City
Grupo Salinas